Tatarskaya Slabada is a historical settlement in Minsk, west and northwest of the old city centre.

Geography
It is located on the low left bank of Svislach and was settled by Lipka Tatars from the 15th century (first settlement recorded in 1428) to mid-20th century. It consisted of mainly wooden 1- and 2-storey wooden houses surrounded by lush gardens (local Tatars historically were main suppliers of vegetables and fruit for local markets). The only tall building of the area was a local mosque (Minski Myachet).

History
Tatarskaya Slabada was devastated during the World War II. During Minsk's postwar reconstruction large part of the settlement (including the mosque) was destroyed to provide land for Parkavaya Mahistral avenue (later Praspekt Masherava, currently Praspekt Peramozhtsaǔ). Now the area is built by high-rise office and residential buildings from the 1960s-1980s. Traditional local residents (Lipka Tatars) have been dispersed around the city and no longer have a cultural settlement area.

References

Ethnic enclaves in Europe
Lipka Tatars
History of Minsk
Geography of Minsk
Former populated places in Belarus